Serhiy Strashnenko (born 8 September 1953) is a former professional Soviet football goalkeeper and coach.

References

External links
 
 Kuzmiak, L. Serhiy Strashnenko: "After the aviation disaster with "Pakhtakor", players of the renewed squad were afraid to ascend to skies" (Сергій СТРАШНЕНКО: «Після авіакатастрофи «Пахтакора» гравці оновленого складу боялися здійматися в небо»). Ukrayinskyi futbol. 2013

1953 births
Living people
Sportspeople from Sumy
Soviet footballers
Ukrainian footballers
FC Hoverla Uzhhorod players
FC Karpaty Lviv players
Pakhtakor Tashkent FK players
FC Polissya Zhytomyr players
FC Ahrotekhservis Sumy players
Soviet Top League players
Ukrainian football managers
FC Ahrotekhservis Sumy managers
FC Spartak Sumy managers
FC Zirka Kropyvnytskyi managers
Association football goalkeepers